Palojärv is name of several Estonian lakes:
 Kanepi Palojärv
 Ihamaru Palojärv
 Lutsu Palojärv
 Haavapää Palojärv
 Kääpa Palojärv
 Preeksa Palojärv
 Ando Palojärv
 Väikene Palojärv